Kenneth Siviter (born 10 December 1953) is an English former cricketer.

Siviter was born at Southport in December 1953. He was educated at Liverpool College, before going up to Keble College, Oxford. While studying at Oxford, he made his debut in first-class cricket for Oxford University against Warwickshire at Oxford in 1974. He played first-class cricket for Oxford until 1977, albeit intermittently, making sixteen appearances. Playing as a right-arm medium pace bowler, Siviter had a tendency to ball a proliferation of no-balls, which was a major contributing factor to his lack of appearances for Oxford. In his sixteen appearances for Oxford, he took 25 wickets at an average of 38.56, with best figures of 4 for 67. In addition to playing first-class cricket while at Oxford, he also made a single List A one-day appearance for the Combined Universities cricket team in the 1976 Benson & Hedges Cup against Surrey.

References

External links

1953 births
Living people
Sportspeople from Southport
People educated at Liverpool College
Alumni of Keble College, Oxford
English cricketers
Oxford University cricketers
British Universities cricketers